Tom Moffatt (born January 1940) is a former Irish Fianna Fáil politician. Moffatt was first elected to Dáil Éireann a Fianna Fáil Teachta Dála (TD) for the Mayo East constituency at the 1992 general election. He was re-elected for the Mayo constituency at the 1997 general election. In July 1997 he was appointed as Minister of State at the Department of Health in the government of Bertie Ahern. He lost his seat at the 2002 general election.

References

1940 births
Living people
Fianna Fáil TDs
Politicians from County Mayo
Members of the 27th Dáil
Members of the 28th Dáil
Ministers of State of the 28th Dáil